The Directorate of Securing Classified Information is an agency of the Albanian government responsible for drafting policies and procedures for the provision of information classified as "state secret". Established based on law no. 8457, dated 11.2.1999 "On information classified as state secret" but later amended, the agency is a subordinate institution of the Prime Minister's Office.

Overview
The Directorate of Securing Classified Information (DSIK) was created by order no. 742, dated 14.2.2001 of the Prime Minister. Originally tasked with drafting policies, programs and procedures for the provision of information classified as "state secret", the directorate has in later years contributed to the alignment of legislation conforming to NATO security standards on classified information by establishing a Registry System for the exchange of NATO classified information.

In 2016, the DSIK, pursuant to law no. 84/2016 "On the transitional re-evaluation of judges and prosecutors in the Republic of Albania", as a supervising authority became part of an important judicial process, where in collaboration with other relevant vetting institutions, examined the biographies of judges and prosecutors using three criteria: the legality of their assets; their professional standing; their possible links to organized crime.

Directors

References

Government agencies of Albania